Niko Henrichon is a Canadian comic book writer/artist. He is best known his work with writer Brian K. Vaughan in creating the graphic novel Pride of Baghdad. Henrichon's first major work was a graphic novel titled Barnum!, written by Howard Chaykin and David Tischman, but he also did work for Fables, New X-Men, Sandman, and Spider-Man. He regularly provides covers for Marvel Comics and DC Comics on series like Fantastic Four and X-Men

References

External links

A visual step-by-step guide to the making of Pride of Baghdad by Niko Henrichon

Canadian comics artists
Living people
Year of birth missing (living people)